The Basketball Fix is a 1951 noir sports drama film directed by Felix E. Feist and starring John Ireland, Marshall Thompson and Vanessa Brown. The film is also known by the alternative title The Big Decision in the United Kingdom. It is based on the CCNY point shaving scandal.

Plot
Sports journalist Peter Ferredey tries to prevent promising college basketball player Johnny Long from becoming involved with a betting ring, but is unable to stop him from shaving points during games for gambler Mike Taft.

Production
Basketball betting had existed for many years but grew during the 1940s. Since the start of college doubleheaders (two games in a row) at Madison Square Garden in 1934 and the invention of spread betting by Charles K. McNeil  circa 1940, gamblers "embraced the excitement of college basketball and the financial possibilities of betting the spread". Still, the general public considered amateur college basketball "pure", and it was not until 1951, after multiple trials resulting from the CCNY point shaving scandal, when awareness of college basketball gambling centered in New York became widespread. Based on this scandal, Realart Pictures released The Basketball Fix in 1951. Edward Leven produced it; Peter R. Brooke and Charles Peck Jr. wrote the screenplay. The book Basketball in America states, "This movie exploited the fascination people had with the daily media reports of the actual investigation and the subsequent trials." The film had to do with both "society and basketball".

Release
The film was shown nationwide beginning in 1951, including at the Palace Theatre in New York City, the Majestic Theatre in Shamokin, Pennsylvania, and the Roxy Theatre in Decatur, Alabama. Alpha Video, Digiview Entertainment, and St. Clair Entertainment Group released it on DVD.

Reception
A review in The New York Times said, "While The Basketball Fix is on the timid side, it is worth the effort put into it, and points the way to better and more constructive social comments." The Decatur Daily wrote, "When Hollywood unlimbers its big cameras and turns the heat of a spotlight on a dramatic situation like The Basketball Fix...you can generally count on plenty of fireworks – and you won't be disappointed this time." A TV Guide review said, "Surprisingly, the scandal in The Basketball Fix was small potatoes compared to the one that rocked the real basketball world in 1951."

References

External links 

1951 films
Jack Broder Productions Inc. films
American crime drama films
1950s sports drama films
American basketball films
1951 crime drama films
American black-and-white films
American sports drama films
Films scored by Raoul Kraushaar
CCNY Beavers men's basketball
1950s English-language films
Films directed by Felix E. Feist
1950s American films